The Charnequeira goat breed from Portugal is used for the production of meat and milk.  It is normally of a red coloration.

Sources

Goat breeds
Dairy goat breeds
Meat goat breeds
Goat breeds originating in Portugal